Nathan Cesar Sodario Torquato (born 9 January 2001) is a Brazilian para taekwondo practitioner. He won the gold medal in the men's 61 kg event at the 2020 Summer Paralympics in Tokyo, Japan. In the final, his opponent Mohamed El-Zayat of Egypt was unable to compete due to injury and, as a result, Torquato was awarded the gold medal.

In 2019, he won the gold medal in the men's 61 kg event at the Parapan American Games held in Lima, Peru.

References

Living people
2001 births
Sportspeople from São Paulo (state)
Brazilian male taekwondo practitioners
Medalists at the 2019 Parapan American Games
Paralympic taekwondo practitioners of Brazil
Taekwondo practitioners at the 2020 Summer Paralympics
Medalists at the 2020 Summer Paralympics
Paralympic gold medalists for Brazil
Paralympic medalists in taekwondo
21st-century Brazilian people
People from Praia Grande